Michael Pollesel is an Anglican bishop in Uruguay. He has been Bishop of Uruguay since 2012.

A fluent Spanish speaker, Pollesel is a former general secretary of the Anglican Church of Canada.

References

21st-century Anglican bishops in South America
Living people
Anglican bishops of Uruguay
Year of birth missing (living people)